Victor Olivier de Puymanel (1768 in Carpentras - 1799 in Malacca), Nguyễn Văn Tín (阮文信) or Ông Tín in Vietnamese, was a French construction officer and a French Navy volunteer and adventurer who had an important role in Vietnam in the 18th and 19th century. He played a key role in the modernization of the army of Nguyễn Phúc Ánh (the future Emperor Gia Long).

Olivier de Puymanel was second-class volunteer on board the French warship Dryade. In 1788 he deserted his ship while in Pulo Condor. He soon entered into the service of the Vietnamese prince Nguyễn Phúc Ánh at the instigation of Pigneau de Behaine, who was setting up a force of French volunteers to help the latter regain the throne.

Olivier de Puymanel supervised the construction of the Citadel of Saigon, according to the design of the French engineer in Vietnam Théodore Lebrun.

He also trained Vietnamese troops in the modern use of artillery, and implemented European infantry methods in the Vietnamese army of Nguyễn Phúc Ánh. In 1792, Olivier de Puymanel was commanding an army of 600 men who had been trained with European techniques.

Puymanel built a fortress in Duyên Khanh, near Nha Trang, where he defended the city against Tây Sơn forces, together with Pigneau de Behaine and Prince Cảnh. In 1795, Puymanel engineered the campaign to take Nha Trang.

Puymanel is said to have trained the 50,000 men of Nguyen's army, while Dayot was in charge of the Navy. The results of these French efforts at the modernization of Vietnamese forces were attested by John Crawfurd, who visited Huế in 1822:

Olivier de Puymanel also worked on the cartography of the Vietnamese coast, together with Jean-Marie Dayot, another French officer in the service of Nguyễn Phúc Ánh.

Pigneau de Behaine and Puymanel seem to have disliked each other, and Pigneau was rather unimpressed with Puymanel's drinking habits and reliance on Saigon prostitutes.

See also

France-Vietnam relations

Notes

References
 Mantienne, Frédéric 1999 Monseigneur Pigneau de Béhaine, Editions Eglises d'Asie, 128 Rue du Bac, Paris,  

Military history of Vietnam
Generals of the Nguyễn lords
Mandarins of the Nguyễn lords
1768 births
1799 deaths
People from Carpentras
French Navy officers